Andreína Vanessa Castro Martínez (born 16 July 1991, Maracay) is a Venezuelan beauty queen and model. She was the winner of the Teen Model Venezuela 2007 pageant held in Caracas, Venezuela on August 20, 2007.

Castro represented the Aragua state in the Miss Venezuela 2009 pageant, on September 24, 2009, and placed in the 10 semifinalists. She studied Periodism.

References

External links
Miss Venezuela Official Website
Miss Venezuela La Nueva Era MB
Andreina in Miss Tourism Universe 2010

1991 births
Living people
People from Maracay
Venezuelan female models